Dolabrifera is a genus of sea hares, a taxonomic group of sea slugs or marine opisthobranch gastropod mollusks belonging to the family Aplysiidae.

Species
Species within the genus Dolabrifera include:
 Dolabrifera brazieri Sowerby, 1870
 Dolabrifera dolabrifera (Rang, 1828)
 Dolabrifera fusca Pease, 1868
 Dolabrifera holboelli Bergh, 1872: species inquirenda
 Dolabrifera jacksoniensis Pilsbry, 1896
 Dolabrifera vitraea G.B. Sowerby II, 1868
 Species brought into synonymy
 Dolabrifera ascifera: synonym of Dolabrifera dolabrifera (Rang, 1828)
 Dolabrifera cuvieri H. Adams & A. Adams, 1854: synonym of Dolabrifera dolabrifera (Rang, 1828)
 Dolabrifera maillardi Deshayes, 1863: synonym of Dolabrifera dolabrifera (Rang, 1828)
 Dolabrifera nicaraguana Pilsbry, 1896: synonym of Dolabrifera dolabrifera (Rang, 1828)
 Dolabrifera olivacea Pease, 1860: synonym of Dolabrifera dolabrifera (Rang, 1828)
 Dolabrifera sowerbyi G.B. Sowerby II, 1868: synonym of Dolabrifera dolabrifera (Rang, 1828)
 Dolabrifera swiftii Pilsbry, 1896: synonym of Dolabrifera dolabrifera (Rang, 1828)
 Dolabrifera virens A. E. Verrill, 1901: synonym of Dolabrifera dolabrifera (Rang, 1828)

References

 Vaught, K.C. (1989). A classification of the living Mollusca. American Malacologists: Melbourne, FL (USA). . XII, 195 pp.
 Gofas, S.; Le Renard, J.; Bouchet, P. (2001). Mollusca, in: Costello, M.J. et al. (Ed.) (2001). European register of marine species: a check-list of the marine species in Europe and a bibliography of guides to their identification. Collection Patrimoines Naturels, 50: pp. 180–213

External links 
 Thompson T. E. & Bebbington A. (1973). "Scanning electron microscope studies of gastropod radulae". Malacologia 14: 147-165.
 Images of Dolabrifera dolabrifera.
 Dolabrifera page at Sea Slug Forum.

Aplysiidae
Taxa named by John Edward Gray